National Tertiary Route 909, or just Route 909 (or ) is a National Road Route of Costa Rica, located in the Guanacaste province.

Description
In Guanacaste province the route covers Santa Cruz canton (Santa Cruz, Veintisiete de Abril, Tempate districts).

References

Highways in Costa Rica